Hau Ruck is the fourteenth album by industrial rock band KMFDM, released by Metropolis Records on September 13, 2005. It was recorded in Seattle, Washington.

This album returns KMFDM to its industrial rock roots, leaving the alternative metal and nu metal on display in the previous albums Attak and WWIII.

Background
While touring in support of 2003's WWIII, band leader Sascha Konietzko discussed the group's plans for the next album: "What we can all agree on, and I'm not saying we disagree on any other things, but everybody was pointing out that it should be really different. There are terms floating around such as, 'More noisy, more dance-y, more electronic and less butt rock.'"  After releasing a single album with Sanctuary Records, the band re-signed with Metropolis Records.

The album had originally been titled FUBAR, in reference to the military acronym standing for "Fucked Up Beyond All Recognition/Repair". However, in June 2005 the band announced they were abandoning that title, and on July 21, 2005, they announced the new title would be Hau Ruck, German for "heave-ho". Hau Ruck is the first KMFDM album without a five-letter word title since 1988's Don't Blow Your Top.

Production
According to Sascha Konietzko, Hau Ruck was created entirely using analog equipment.

Release
Hau Ruck was released on September 13, 2005.  Many songs from Hau Ruck were remixed for KMFDM's next release, Ruck Zuck.

Track listing

Personnel
 Lucia Cifarelli – vocals
 Jules Hodgson – guitars, bass, programming, engineering
 Sascha Konietzko – vocals, analogue synthesizers, sequencers, engineering
 Andy Selway – drums, programming
 Steve White – guitars, programming
 Mina Stolle – trumpet (11)

References

External links
 KMFDM DØTKØM Hau Ruck lyrics at the official KMFDM website

2005 albums
KMFDM albums
Metropolis Records albums